The Central Pennsylvania League was a minor league baseball league which operated in several Pennsylvania cities from 1887 to 1888 and again from 1896 to 1898.

Cities represented
Ashland, PA: Ashland 1887–1888
Bloomsburg, PA: Bloomsburg Blue Jays 1897 
Danville, PA: Danville 1887
Hazleton, PA: Hazleton 1887; Hazleton Pugilists 1888 
Lock Haven, PA: Lock Haven Maroons 1897
Mahanoy City, PA: Mahanoy City 1887–1888
Milton, PA: Milton 1896–1897
Minersville, PA: Minersville 1887 
Mount Carmel, PA: Mount Carmel Reliance 1887–1888 
Pottsville, PA: Pottsville Grays 1897
Shamokin, PA: Shamokin Maroons 1887–1888; Shamokin Reds 1897 
Shenandoah, PA: Shenandoah Hungarian Rioters 1888 
Sunbury, PA: Sunbury 1887; Sunbury Railroaders 1897
Williamsport, PA: Williamsport Demorest 1897

Yearly standings

1887 Central Pennsylvania League

1888 Central Pennsylvania League
 Shamokin disbanded July 7.Hazleton withdrew August 7 to join Central League.

1897 Central Pennsylvania League
 Sunbury entered the league June 3; Shamokin (13–17) transferred to Lock Haven June 26; Pottsville disbanded June 27. A new Shamokin team entered the league July 11, taking Pottsville's record, then disbanded September 6.

References

External links
 Baseball-Reference (Minors)

Defunct minor baseball leagues in the United States
Baseball leagues in Pennsylvania
Sports leagues established in 1887
Sports leagues disestablished in 1898